For a New Critique of Political Economy is a book by French philosopher Bernard Stiegler. It was published in 2010 by Polity Press and is translated by Daniel Ross.

The book is composed of two separate but related parts: "For a New Critique of Political Economy," and "Pharmacology of Capital and Economy of Contribution." The first section was published as a short book in France, Pour une nouvelle critique de l'économie politique (2009) , whereas the second section is part of a larger work published in France under the title, Ce qui fait que la vie vaut la peine d'être vécue (2010)  .

Both sections constitute a response to the global financial crisis, and introduce Stiegler's ideas about the relation of technology and economy, as well as calling for a new consideration of the questions emerging from the crisis.

Key figures discussed in the book are Plato and Karl Marx.

References 

Works by Bernard Stiegler
2010 non-fiction books
Philosophy books
Critique of political economy
Polity (publisher) books